Mitchell Samuel Thomas Stokes (born 27 March 1987) is an English cricketer. Stokes is a right-handed batsman who bowls right-arm off break. He was born in Basingstoke, Hampshire.

During his schooling years, he was educated at Cranbourne School, before progressing to Basingstoke College of Technology. Having progressed through the youth system at Hampshire, Stokes represented England Under-19's in youth Test and One Day International matches during the 2004/05 tour to India and Malaysia.

In the 2005 season, Stokes made his first XI debut for Hampshire after spending a number of seasons in the Second XI. His first team debut came against Sussex in the 2005 Twenty20 Cup. Stokes played 14 Twenty20 matches for Hampshire from 2005 to 2006, playing his final match in that format against Middlesex in the 2006 competition. In the 2006 competition, he became at the time the youngest person to score a Twenty20 half century when he scored 62 against Middlesex in 2006, sharing in a partnership of 122 with Michael Carberry for the 1st wicket, which as of the 2010 season remains a Hampshire record partnership for that wicket.

On 20 August 2006 he made his List A debut for Hampshire in a tour match against West Indies A. During the match he scored 36 runs off just 18 balls and bowled 4 overs in Hampshire's 62-run win. Stokes played 3 further List A matches in 2006 and one further match in 2007, which came against Essex in the 2007 Friends Provident Trophy; this was Stokes' final List A appearance.

After failing to break into the first XI, Stokes was released by Hampshire at the end of the 2007 season. Prior to making his first team debut for Hampshire, Stokes had played Minor counties cricket for Berkshire. Making his debut for the county in 2005, he played for them until 2008 in the Minor Counties Championship and until 2009 in the MCCA Knockout Trophy. In 2010, he joined Wiltshire, making his debut for the county in the MCCA Knockout Trophy against Cornwall, as well as playing for them in the Minor Counties Championship.

References

External links
Mitchell Stokes at ESPNcricinfo
Mitchell Stokes at CricketArchive

1987 births
Living people
Berkshire cricketers
Cricketers from Basingstoke
English cricketers
Hampshire cricketers
Wiltshire cricketers